"Lonely Woman" is a jazz composition by Ornette Coleman. Coleman's recording of it was the opening track on his 1959 Atlantic Records album The Shape of Jazz to Come. Alongside Coleman's alto saxophone, the recording featured Don Cherry on cornet, Charlie Haden  on double bass and Billy Higgins on drums.

Origin
In an interview with Jacques Derrida, Coleman spoke of the origin of  the composition:

Other versions
Haden and Cherry revisited the song on Old and New Dreams (ECM, 1979), Haden doing so again on Etudes (1987) and In Angel City (1988).

Pianist John Lewis first recorded the song in January 1962 with the Modern Jazz Quartet for their album of the same name which was one of the earliest recorded covers of a Coleman number. Later that year, in July, Lewis recorded it again for his album European Encounter.

Vocal versions, with lyrics written by Margo Guryan, have been recorded by Chris Connor (1962), Freda Payne (1964, on After the Lights Go Down Low and Much More!!!) and Carola Standertskjöld (1966).

References

1959 compositions
1950s jazz standards
Jazz compositions
Songs written by Margo Guryan
1959 songs